Zoltán Szügyi (9 February 1896, Huszt, Kingdom of Hungary – 23 November 1967, Budapest, Hungarian People's Republic) was a Hungarian Officer during World War II. He was a recipient of the Knight's Cross of the Iron Cross of Nazi Germany.

Szügyi commanded the Szent László Infantry Division during its entire existence between October 1944 and May 1945. He surrendered to the British Army around Klagenfurt, but was handed over to the Hungarian authorities in March 1946. Following his capture, he was sentenced to 10 years imprisonment on 28 November  1949 as a war criminal, and released in 1957.

Awards
 Iron Cross (1939) 2nd and 1st Class
 Knight's Cross of the Iron Cross (12 January 1945)

References

 
 

1896 births
1967 deaths
People from Khust
Hungarian soldiers
Hungarian military personnel of World War II
Recipients of the Knight's Cross of the Iron Cross